The West Humboldt Range is a short mountain range in the western Great Basin in northwestern Nevada in the United States.

Geography
The southwest end of the range is approximately  ENE of Reno.

The range separates the lower course and terminus-(Humboldt Lake) of the Humboldt River and the Humboldt Sink on the northwest side from the expansive Carson Sink on the south and southeast side. Interstate 80 follows the course of the Humboldt along the northwest side of the range. During the last ice age, the range stood along the shore of Lake Lahontan, the prehistoric shorelines and beaches of which are visible along the sides of the range.

Few peaks in the range are named; one of the few with an official name is Topog Peak in northern Churchill County, near the southwestern end of the range.

History
In 1905 the Saurian Expedition, led by John C. Merriam and financed by Annie Alexander, explored the Triassic limestones of the range, discovering 25 specimens of Ichthyosaur.

See also
Mountain ranges of Nevada
Great Basin
Basin and Range Province

References

External links

Exploring Nevada's Ice Age Lake: West Humboldt Range

Mountain ranges of Nevada
Mountain ranges of Pershing County, Nevada
Mountain ranges of Churchill County, Nevada
Range, West Humboldt